Judith Nneka Chime (born 20 May 1978 in Lagos) is a Nigerian former football goalkeeper. She played for the Nigeria women's national football team at the 1999 FIFA Women's World Cup, and at the 2000 Summer Olympics.

See also
 Nigeria at the 2000 Summer Olympics

References

External links
 
 
 Clayton State player profile
 soccerpunter
 womensfootballarchive
 allafrica.com

1978 births
Living people
Nigerian women's footballers
Place of birth missing (living people)
Footballers at the 2000 Summer Olympics
Olympic footballers of Nigeria
Women's association football goalkeepers
Nigeria women's international footballers
1999 FIFA Women's World Cup players